Jin Na is the name of:

 Jin Na (synchronized swimmer) (born 1976), Chinese synchronized swimmer
 Jin Na (screenwriter) (born  1976), Chinese screenwriter